The Alternative is a local political party in Ljungby Municipality, Sweden. Alternativet was founded in 1994. The party president is Roland Johansson, secretary Rune Arvidsson and treasurer Jörgen Källdalen.

In the 2002 municipal elections Alternativet got 1301 votes (8.0%) and four seats.

External links
 Party website

Swedish local political parties